Ľuboš Podstupka (born 25 September 1972) is a Slovak rower. He competed in the men's lightweight double sculls event at the 2004 Summer Olympics.

References

External links
 

1972 births
Living people
Slovak male rowers
Olympic rowers of Slovakia
Rowers at the 2004 Summer Olympics
Sportspeople from Bratislava